Goin' Places is the second album by American bass guitarist Michael Henderson, released in 1977 by Buddah Records.

Track listing
All tracks composed by Michael Henderson; except where indicated
"Whip It"  4:01
"Goin' Places" 4:08
"Let Me Love You" (Michael Henderson, Ray Parker Jr.)  5:00
"I Can't Help It" 4:16
"I'll Be Understanding" (Michael Henderson, Rudy Robinson)  3:03
"At The Concert" Duet w/ Roberta Flack 7:16 
"Won't You Be Mine" (Ken Peterson)  7:00

Personnel
Michael Henderson - lead and backing vocals, bass, bongos, guitar, keyboards
Herbie Hancock - Fender Rhodes
Ray Parker Jr., Randall Jacobs  - guitar
Jerry Jones - drums
Mark Johnson - Fender Rhodes, hand-clapping, synthesizer
Rudy Robinson - ARP strings, hand-clapping, Clavinet, Fender Rhodes, guitar, piano
Ollie E. Brown, Lorenzo Brown - percussion
Eli Fontaine, Marcus Belgrave, Norma Jean Bell - horns
Ralph Moss - horns, strings
Rod Lumpkin - organ
Eli Fontaine - soprano saxophone
Steve Hunter - trombone
Barbara Shelley, Wesley Gullick - hand-clapping
Gwen Guthrie, Yolanda McCullough, Brenda White - backing vocals
Roberta Flack - co-lead vocals on "At the Concert"

Charts

Singles

References

External links
 Michael Henderson-Goin' Places at Discogs

1977 albums
Michael Henderson albums
Buddah Records albums
Albums recorded at Electric Lady Studios